Billy Monagle (26 November 1876 – 28 February 1941) was an Australian rules footballer who played with Carlton in the Victorian Football League (VFL).

Notes

External links 

Billy Monagle's profile at Blueseum

1876 births
1941 deaths
Australian rules footballers from Victoria (Australia)
Carlton Football Club players